Experimental & Molecular Medicine is a monthly peer-reviewed open access medical journal covering biochemistry and molecular biology. It was established in 1964 as the Korean Journal of Biochemistry or Taehan Saenghwa Hakhoe Chapchi and published bi-annually. It was originally in Korean becoming an English-language journal in 1975. In 1994 the journal began publishing quarterly. It obtained its current name in 1996 at which time it also began publishing bi-monthly, switching to monthly in 2009. It is the official journal of the Korean Society for Medical Biochemistry and Molecular Biology. The editor-in-chief is Dae-Myung Jue (Catholic University of Korea). It is published by the Nature Publishing Group. The full text of the journal from 2008 to the present is available at PubMed Central.

Abstracting and indexing 
The journal is abstracted and indexed in:

According to the Journal Citation Reports, the journal had a 2020 impact factor of 8.718, ranking it 14th out of 140 journals in the category "Medicine, Research & Experimental" and 34th out of 298 journals in the category "Biochemistry & Molecular Biology".

References

External links 

Korean Society for Medical Biochemistry and Molecular Biology

Biochemistry journals
English-language journals
Nature Research academic journals
Publications established in 1964
Monthly journals
Academic journals associated with learned and professional societies